Alexander Blaine Brown was elected the seventh president of Jefferson College on October 14, 1847.  The son of Matthew Brown, Jefferson College's fifth president, Brown was professor of belles lettres and adjunct professor of languages from 1841 to 1847.  Under his presidency the college continued to prosper and in 1852 Phi Kappa Psi fraternity was founded at Jefferson College. Brown resigned in August 1856 due to ill health.

Selected works

References

Presidents of Washington & Jefferson College
1808 births
1853 deaths